Bar Hill Fort was a Roman fort on the Antonine Wall in Scotland. It was built around the year 142 A.D.. Older maps and documents sometimes spell the name as Barr Hill. A computer generated fly around for the site has been produced. Lidar scans have been done along the length of the wall including Bar Hill. Sir George Macdonald wrote about the excavation of the site. Many other artefacts have also been found at Shirva, about a mile away on the other side of Twechar.

Many Roman forts along the wall held garrisons of around 500 men. Larger forts like Castlecary and Birrens had a nominal cohort of 1000 men but probably sheltered women and children as well although the troops were not allowed to marry. There is likely too to have been large communities of civilians around the site.

An altar (RIB 2167) to Silvanus was found in 1895 on Bar Hill. It's thought to have originated from a small shrine outside the fort. The altar is now kept in the Hunterian Museum, Glasgow along with others like the one found at Castlecary. A 43 foot deep well was discovered at the site. Several item were recovered from the well. It's possible they were dumped there when the site was abandoned. Shoes from men, women and children were found leading to suggestions of family life. Other recovered items include an altar, bones, shells and coins. Structural materials like building columns, wooden beams were found as was part of the pulley of the well. Videos of some reconstructed objects like a barrel, a window. and various columns have been produced as well as one of a bust of Silenus.

Bar Hill Fort was one of over a dozen forts built along the Antonine Wall from around 140 AD. These follow a short route across Scotland’s central belt which was largely followed in the 18th century when constructing the Forth and Clyde canal. On the south-facing slope of the hill is the headquarters; it is the biggest building that can be seen. The remains of a Roman bathhouse can also be observed.

References

Forts of the Antonine Wall
Archaeological sites in East Dunbartonshire
Roman auxiliary forts in Scotland